The 2003–04 Mid-American Conference men's basketball season began with practices in October 2003, followed by the start of the 2003–04 NCAA Division I men's basketball season in November. Conference play began in January 2004 and concluded in March 2004. Western Michigan won the regular season title with a conference record of 15–3 by two games over second-place Kent State. Western Michigan defeated Kent State in the MAC tournament final and represented the MAC in the NCAA tournament. There they lost in the first round to Vanderbilt.

Preseason awards
The preseason poll was announced by the league office on October 23, 2003.

Preseason men's basketball poll
Northern Illinois was picked by the media to win the West Division while Miami was tabbed as the favorite in the East.

Honors

Postseason

Mid–American Tournament

NCAA tournament

Postseason awards

Coach of the Year: Reggie Witherspoon, Buffalo
Player of the Year: Mike Williams, Western Michigan
Freshman of the Year: Justin Ingram, Toledo
Defensive Player of the Year:  John Edwards, Kent State
Sixth Man of the Year: Reggie Berry, Western Michigan

Honors

See also
2003–04 Mid-American Conference women's basketball season

References